"Maplewood", also known as Sebrell-McCausland Farm, is a historic home and national historic district located near Pliny, Mason County, West Virginia.  The district includes eight contributing buildings and four contributing sites.  The main house is a two-story Italianate-style brick farmhouse with wood siding.  It features two round attic portholes and three porches.  Also on the property are the following contributing buildings / sites: a coal house, chicken house, blacksmith shop, and well house all built about 1870; the Jenny Lind House (c. 1880); a schoolhouse / storage shed (c. 1890); machine shed (c. 1910); the ruins of the main barn and hog barn (c. 1870); and the Sebrell-McCausland Cemetery and Slave Cemetery, both established about 1850.

It was listed on the National Register of Historic Places in 2000.

References

Houses on the National Register of Historic Places in West Virginia
Historic districts in Mason County, West Virginia
Italianate architecture in West Virginia
Houses completed in 1870
Houses in Mason County, West Virginia
Cemeteries in West Virginia
Farms on the National Register of Historic Places in West Virginia
National Register of Historic Places in Mason County, West Virginia
Historic districts on the National Register of Historic Places in West Virginia
Blacksmith shops